Ekboarmia is a genus of moths in the family Geometridae.

Species
Per Skou, Stüning & Sihvonen 2017, the genus comprises the following species:
 Ekboarmia atlanticaria (Staudinger, 1859)
 Exboarmia atlanticaria ssp. holli (Oberthür, 1909)
 Ekboarmia fascinataria (Staudinger, 1900)
 Ekboarmia miniaria Skou, Stüning & Sihvonen, 2017
 Ekboarmia sagnesi Dufay, 1979

References

 Ekboarmia at Markku Savela's Lepidoptera and Some Other Life Forms
 Natural History Museum Lepidoptera genus database

Boarmiini